Gumaa Abas Omer (born 3 November 1994) is a Sudanese professional footballer who plays as a midfielder for Al-Hilal Omdurman and the Sudan national football team.

References 

1994 births
Living people
2021 Africa Cup of Nations players
Al-Hilal Club (Omdurman) players
Association football midfielders
Sudan international footballers
Sudan Premier League players
Sudanese expatriate footballers
Sudanese footballers